Tuscarora Mountain Tunnel is one of four original Pennsylvania Turnpike tunnels still in active use. A second tube was bored in the late 1960s to ease traffic conditions. The Tuscarora Mountain tunnels measure  in length and are the second-longest active tunnels on the Pennsylvania Turnpike system. The  Sideling Hill Tunnel is the longest overall, but was abandoned in 1968. Allegheny Mountain Tunnel is the longest in active use.  The Tuscarora Mountain Tunnel sits on the Huntingdon/Franklin County line.

References

Interstate 76 (Ohio–New Jersey)
Transportation buildings and structures in Franklin County, Pennsylvania
Transportation buildings and structures in Huntingdon County, Pennsylvania
Toll tunnels in Pennsylvania
Pennsylvania Turnpike Commission
Road tunnels in Pennsylvania